Clinton Cemetery is  cemetery in Irvington, Essex County, New Jersey. The non-sectarian lot-owner owned cemetery comprises  near Union Avenue and Lyons Avenue; the Elizabeth River lies at its western boundary. There have been approximately 11,000 burials.

History

Clinton Cemetery Association was founded on Feb 28, 1844. At the time Irvington was beginning to form as Camptown, an unincorporated village in the no-longer extant Clinton Township. In 1852 Camptown's name was changed to Irvington. An 1889 report of the Department of Health of the State of New Jersey found with respect to the township of Clinton: "There are two cemeteries, or burial-places, in the township – Clinton cemetery, in the village and upon the banks of Elizabeth river, and Newark potter's field, down in the salt meadow section". Purchases of ground between 1856 and 1928 expanded the cemetery to its present size.

In 2010, Clinton Cemetery was the site of two sexual assaults conducted by the same man several months apart; the offender was captured by police in the cemetery on the second occasion.

Notable burials
 More than 500 veterans, including two from the American Revolutionary War and many from the American Civil War.
 Four mayors of Irvington: John V. Cleve, James Mortland, Edward Folsom, William L. Glorieux
 Amos J. Cummings (1838–1902), United States Representative from New York 
 Cyrus Durand Chapman (1856–1918), American artist, inventor, architect, first director Bureau of Engraving and Printing
 Joseph E. Haynes (1826–1897), 20th Mayor of Newark, New Jersey, 1884–1894.

References

External links
 

Cemeteries in Essex County, New Jersey
Irvington, New Jersey
1844 establishments in New Jersey